Thomas Black (born 11 October 1962) is a Scottish former footballer who played for Airdrieonians, St Mirren, Kilmarnock and Stranraer. Black played as a left back and scored goals as a free-kick and penalty taker, particularly at Kilmarnock.

References

External links

1962 births
Living people
Sportspeople from Lanark
Association football fullbacks
Scottish footballers
Airdrieonians F.C. (1878) players
St Mirren F.C. players
Kilmarnock F.C. players
Stranraer F.C. players
Stonehouse Violet F.C. players
Scottish Junior Football Association players
Scottish Football League players
Footballers from South Lanarkshire